Pfarr is a surname. Notable people with this surname include:

 Bernd Pfarr (de) (1958–2004), German painter and cartoonist, author of Sondermann
 Frederick Pfarr Stamp Jr. (born 1934), American judge
 Paul Pfarr, character in March Violets
 Robert Pfarr (1920–2006), American cyclist

See also
 Pfarr Log House, Ohio, United States
 Farr (surname)